is a former Japanese football player.

Club career
Kimura was born in Ibaraki on May 1, 1984. He joined Gamba Osaka from youth team in 2003. However he could hardly play in the match, behind Naoki Matsuyo and Yosuke Fujigaya. In December 2009, he debuted in Emperor's Cup semifinal. In May 2012, he became a regular goalkeeper. However he got hurt in June. He lost his opportunity to play. He retired end of 2014 season.

National team career
In September 2001, Kimura was selected Japan U-17 national team for 2001 U-17 World Championship, but he did not play in the match behind Kenta Tokushige.

Club statistics

References

External links

1984 births
Living people
Association football people from Osaka Prefecture
People from Ibaraki, Osaka
Japanese footballers
J1 League players
J2 League players
Gamba Osaka players
Association football goalkeepers